Cherry Branch is a planned community and census-designated place (CDP) in Craven County, North Carolina, United States. It was first listed as a CDP in the 2020 census with a population of 1,211.

The community is in southeastern Craven County, on the south bank of the tidal Neuse River. A free ferry runs from Cherry Branch across the Neuse River to Minnesott Beach in Pamlico County.

Demographics

2020 census

Note: the US Census treats Hispanic/Latino as an ethnic category. This table excludes Latinos from the racial categories and assigns them to a separate category. Hispanics/Latinos can be of any race.

References 

Census-designated places in Craven County, North Carolina
Census-designated places in North Carolina